Bend Sinister is the third release EP by Vancouver band, Bend Sinister released on September 14, 2007. The video for the first single, "Time Breaks Down", received moderate play on Muchmusic and was nominated for CBC Radio 3's 2007 Video of the Year Bucky award.

Track listing 
 Yours Truly - 3:05
 T.V War - 3:57
 Time Breaks Down - 3:49
 High Horses- 3:25
 Julianna - 6:39

Personnel 
 Dan Moxon – Lead vocals, organ
 Jon Bunyan – guitar, keyboards, vocals
 Naben Ruthnum – Lead guitar
 Dave Buck – bass
 Kevin Keegan – drums (Track 1, 3 & 5)
 Mike Magnusson – drums (Track 2 & 4)

2007 EPs
Bend Sinister (band) EPs